Pelahiivka is an urban-type settlement in Torez Municipality, Horlivka Raion, Donetsk Oblast (province) of eastern Ukraine. Population:

Demographics
Native language as of the Ukrainian Census of 2001:
 Ukrainian 17.35%
 Russian 82.65%
 Belarusian 0.1%
 Armenian 0.03%
 Moldovan (Romanian), Bulgarian, German and Romanian (self-declared) 0.01%

References

Urban-type settlements in Horlivka Raion